is a 2004 video game created by Capcom for the Xbox console where the player controls a Vertical Tank. It is the online-only (via the Xbox Live broadband gaming service) sequel to Capcom's Steel Battalion game. The game was developed by Capcom Production Studio 4, Nude Maker. Gameplay is similar to that of the previous game, utilizing the same two joystick, three pedal, 40 button controller.

In the game, players engage in mechanized combat using Vertical Tank, the game terminology for very large bipedal combat platforms. Vertical Tanks, abbreviated VT's, are fictional vehicles that range in height from 8–15 m. These vehicles are the platform of choice for future combat in the year 2084.

The campaign mode for Steel Battalion: Line of Contact was taken offline on September 30, 2005.

Gameplay
Gameplay is entirely online and consists of various game types such as deathmatch and capture the flag. Up to ten players (five against five) can participate, and each player must have an Xbox, Xbox Live, and a special controller to play the game. However, at this time in everywhere except Japan, matches are limited to 3 vs. 3 with some 4 vs. 4 and rare 5 vs. 5 combat. Players connecting with less than 100 kB/s upload and 300 kB/s download are usually limited to 4 on 4 or 3 on 3 combat. There are a total of 10 new VT's introduced in this game, for a total of 31 different models, but it is worth mentioning that there is no single player mode available. After having their VT destroyed during an online match, the player must go through the entire start-up process again before re-spawning onto the battlefield.

Steel Battalion: Line of Contact was an online-only expansion to the original Steel Battalion. Although the game also supports a System Link mode, the logistics of outfitting for LAN-based play are quite daunting. Each player must have an Xbox, Steel Battalion controller, game disc, and display. Due to LAN support, the game can be played online through LAN tunnelling solutions such as XLink Kai.

Before the closure of the Campaign servers, two modes of play existed for online combat: Campaign Mode and Free Mission mode.

Campaign mode
Campaign Mode took place on a persistent battlefield on which up to four factions would engage in mechanized combat to control landmass areas on the fictional southeast Asian nation of Ocean City Island. The overall Campaign progress was divided into rounds, each of which would last a total of eight weeks. Each week within a Round was termed a Turn, during which three Mission maps were available to select from as the battle arena. At the beginning of each Round, on Turn one, players would be required to select a faction in which to participate. Initially, there were only two factions to select from, the Hai Shi Dao and the Pacific Rim Forces. With the arrival of Turn three, a 3rd independent faction would become available for pilots to transfer their allegiance to, the Right Brothers. Turn 5 would offer the option to transfer to the Jaralaccs Mercenary Forces. Turns would continue to progress over the eight weeks, after which the game would then return to Turn one and begin a new Round.

Each Turn would dictate the Vertical Tanks available for purchase from the Supply Bin of each faction.

Hai Shi Dao (HSD)  in Steel Battalion: Line of Contact, the Hai Shi Dao are presented as a strongly patriotic nation who are actively resisting the occupying army of the Pacific Rim Forces.
HSD 1st Gen VTs: Vitzh, Vortex, m-Vitzh, Scare Face, Scare Face A1
HSD 2nd Gen VTs: Scare Face II, Maelstrom, Garpike, Behemoth
HSD 3rd Gen VTs: Regal Dress N, Regal Dress A, Juggernaut

Pacific Rim Forces (PRF)  unlike in the original Steel Battalion, the sequel casts the Pacific Rim Forces in a much darker light, having them play the part of invading oppressors against the Hai Shi Dao nationalists.
PRF 1st Gen VTs: Decider, Falchion, Decider Volcanic
PRF 2nd Gen VTs: Prominence M1, Prominence M2, Prominence M3, Blade, Rapier
PRF 3rd Gen VTs: Quasar

Right Brothers (RB)  only available after Turn three of each Round, the Right Brothers are fierce individualist freedom fighters, adept at using guerilla tactics and specialized Vertical Tank equipment to defend the native lands of their ancestors.
RB 1st Gen VTs: Colt, Colt Executive
RB 2nd Gen VTs: Yellow Jacket, Sheepdog, Siegeszug
RB 3rd Gen VTs: Earthshaker

Jaralaccs Mercenary Forces (JAR)  the only "faction" that does not fight for its land, the Jaralaccs Mercenaries were able to participate on behalf of any faction within the context of an individual mission and individual pilots could switch their loyalties from mission-to-mission. They first enter the conflict in turn five of the round. The Vertical Tanks of the Jaralaccs were much more durable and suited to individualistic fighting tactics, but also more expensive.
JAR 1st Gen VTs: Vitzh, m-Vitzh
JAR 2nd Gen VTs: Jaralacss N, Jaralaccs C, Jaralaccs NS-R, Jaralaccs Macabre

 The Jaralaccs Macabre was initially classed the 3rd generation VT during the Line of Contact BETA test period and its performance profile still reflects this lineage despite its current 2nd generation classification.

Vertical Tanks are classed across several different performance specifications, with the most generalized being Generation. 1st Generation VTs are generally slower and less unresponsive, have lower armour ratings, firepower, or range. These units are generally very cheap in comparison to the later generations and are easily disposable on the battlefield. 2nd Generation VTs have increased armour, speed, and performance capabilities. 3rd Generation VTs are the epitome of VT design and performance, but also very expensive to field. The loss of 3rd generation machines within a battle would often result in defeat, however, fielding the 3rd generation VT afforded a team an advantage.

Beyond the Generation classification, VTs are further broken down by role type, which included Standard Combat, Support (artillery), Assault (frontline combat), Scout (reconnaissance), and Light (typically fast hit-and-run assault VTs).

Players participate in missions, the result of which determines the number of Supply and Command points they are awarded. Supply points are used to purchase additional Vertical Tanks from the Supply Bin of a pilot's respective faction. Command points are accrued and determine the rank of the pilot profile.

The Supply Bin for each faction could contain both "mass-produced" and "limited-edition" Vertical Tanks. The mass-produced variety was in continuous availability, whereas the limited types could only be purchased if units were available. Typically, the more powerful and expensive VTs were classed as limited. Each VT had a serial number which marked it as unique, thus allowing players to "own" specific VTs within the game world. Due to a flawed resource management design in the programming of the Campaign server, there were no facilities for reallocating limited VTs back into the active pilot community. As a result of both normal player attrition and rampant use of 2 monthly Xbox Live trial cards, innumerable limited class VTs were forever locked up against pilot profiles for Xbox Live players who no longer actively played the game. This resulted in a massive shortage of limited VTs as the game world progressed.

Players would purchase VT's from the Supply Bin to use in missions. When these VT's were not actively being fielded, they would be stored in a virtual hangar space for each player, which was retained on the Campaign server. Each VT would have both a Sortie Point and Supply Point value, the latter being the value required to purchase the VT from the Supply Bin. The Sortie Point value was a "weight" that the vehicle would debit from a team if destroyed in a battle. This value was also used to limit the number of VTs a single player could own, with a maximum of 600 Sortie Points in available hangar space being allocated to each player profile.

In the Campaign Mode, players had to purchase multiple copies of the same type of VT to remain in the conflict.

On September 30, 2005, Capcom ended the Campaign portion of Line of Contact. Free Mission mode was still supported and continued to be popular with LoC players up until April 15, 2010, when support for the original version of Xbox live was dropped, but the LAN portion of the game, which is similar to Free Mission mode, is still played online using XLink Kai.

Free mission
Free Mission mode relied only on the Xbox Live matchmaking services for players to host sessions, thus no external servers were required. Unlike Campaign Mode, Free Mission did not have a complex economy or persistent online conflict, instead, players hosted individual battle sessions using both the original campaign "Conquest" mode of play, as well as "Battle Royale" and "Capture the Container". The LAN portion of the game works similarly to the Xbox Live Free Mission mode.

Conquest
Conquest mode follows much the same formula as Campaign did, with players participating in a single battle on opposing factional sides which are chosen by the host of the session.

Capture the Container
Capture the Container is very similar to traditional Capture the Flag type play modes from other online multiplayer games, but instead of a flag, each team attempts to steal a container from their enemy's base and return it to their own to score points. Bases may be captured, as in Conquest mode, and the flag may be returned to any base their team owns. VT combat is still in play but does not directly affect the outcome of the mission other than to eventually remove opposing players from the battle by eliminating their remaining vehicles.

Battle Royale
Battle Royale is considered a training mode, in which all Vertical Tanks appear on the overall map radar view. Additionally, the game mode is "every player for themselves" in a last-player standing fashion.

Reception

The game received "average" reviews according to the review aggregation website Metacritic.  In Japan, Famitsu gave it a score of one eight, two sevens, and one eight for a total of 30 out of 40.

Notes

References

External links

 LineOfContact.net

2004 video games
Capcom games
Multiplayer video games
Nude Maker games
Steel Battalion
Video game sequels
Video games about mecha
Video games developed in Japan
Video games scored by Masafumi Takada
Xbox games
Xbox-only games